Romanesco is one of the central Italian dialects spoken in the Metropolitan City of Rome Capital, especially in the core city. It is linguistically close to Tuscan and Standard Italian, with some notable differences from these two. Rich in vivid expressions and sayings, Romanesco is used in a typical diglossic setting, mainly for informal/colloquial communication, with code-switching and translanguaging with the standard language.

History 

The medieval Roman dialect belonged to the southern family of Italian dialects, and was thus much closer to the Neapolitan language than to the Florentine. A typical example of Romanesco of that period is Vita di Cola di Rienzo ("Life of Cola di Rienzo"), written by an anonymous Roman during the 14th century. Starting with the 16th century, the Roman dialect underwent a stronger and stronger influence from the Tuscan dialect (from which modern Italian derives) starting with the reigns of the two Medici popes (Leo X and Clement VII) and with the Sack of Rome in 1527, two events which provoked a large immigration from Tuscany. Therefore, current Romanesco has grammar and roots that are rather different from other dialects in Central Italy.

The path towards a progressive Tuscanization of the dialect can be observed in the works of the major Romanesco writers and poets of the past two centuries: Giuseppe Gioachino Belli (1791–1863), whose sonetti romaneschi represent the most important work in this dialect and an eternal monument to 19th century Roman people; Cesare Pascarella (1858–1940); Giggi Zanazzo (1860–1911); and Carlo Alberto Salustri (1871–1950), nicknamed Trilussa.

Diffusion
Before Rome became the capital city of Italy, Romanesco was spoken only inside the walls of the city, while the little towns surrounding Rome had their own dialects.  Nowadays, these dialects have been replaced with a variant of Romanesco, which therefore is now spoken in an area larger than the original one. It slightly pervades the everyday language of most of the immigrants who live in the large city.

Pronunciation

Romanesco pronunciation and spelling differs from Standard Italian in these cases:
 is used where standard Italian uses . This  is spelt , a letter no longer used in Italian. Compare Italian   "son" and Romanesco  ;
geminate  ("rolled r" or alveolar trill) does not exist anymore: for example,  ; ( "light blue"),   ( "he/she would come"). This phenomenon presumably developed after 1870, as it was not present in the classical 19th century Romanesco of Belli;
 becomes  before another consonant:  , Italian  "money";
the dropping of vowels at the beginning of a word when followed by a nasal consonant (m, n, gn), for example 'nzomma (Standard Italian ), 'n (Standard Italian ), 'mparà (Standard Italian ), gni (Standard Italian ).
assimilation with different consonant groups. (typically a Central-Southern phenomenon) For example,  turns into  (Standard Italian  turns into ),  turns into  (Standard Italian  turns into ),  turns into  (Standard Italian  turns into ).

Noteworthy figures
Today, Romanesco is generally considered more of a regional idiom than a true language. Classical Romanesco, which reached high literature with Giuseppe Gioachino Belli, has disappeared.

External forces such as immigration and the dominance of Italian are playing a role in the transformation.

Notable artists using Romanesco

 Ettore Petrolini, actor
 Elena Fabrizi, actor and cook
 Antonello Venditti, singer
 Aldo Fabrizi, actor and director
 Alberto Sordi, actor and director
 Nino Manfredi, actor
 Anna Magnani, actress
 Gabriella Ferri, singer
 Tomas Milian, actor
 Mario Brega, actor and comedian
 Gigi Proietti, actor, director and comedian
 Enrico Montesano, actor and comedian
 Carlo Verdone, actor and director
 Sabrina Ferilli, actress
 Trilussa, poet (Carlo Alberto Salustri's pen name)
 Giuseppe Gioacchino Belli, poet
 Cesare Pascarella, poet
 Lando Fiorini, actor and singer
 Franco Califano, lyricist, musician, 
  Ferruccio Amendola, voice actor
 The anonymous writers of the Pasquinades posted on the talking statues of Rome use Italian, Romanesco or a mixture of both.

See also
 Belli's The Sovrans of the Old World (1831)

References

Sources

External links
A description of the Roman dialect
  Lucio Felici, Le vicende del dialetto romanesco, in "Capitolium", 1972 (XLVII), n° 4, pp. 26–33 (it is a summary of the history of Romanesco from the origin to nowadays).

Dialects of Italian
Culture in Rome
Languages of Vatican City
City colloquials